Prairieville is an extinct town in Perry Township, Clinton County, Indiana, in the United States.  About five miles west of the town of Manson, it was abandoned during the 19th century.

References

Former populated places in Clinton County, Indiana
Former populated places in Indiana